Different Kinds of Light is the second full-length album from British singer-songwriter Jade Bird. The album was released on 13 August 2021.

Track listing

Charts

References

2021 albums
Jade Bird albums
Glassnote Records albums